Karl Praechter (17 October 1858, Heidelberg – 18 February 1933, Halle an der Saale) was a German classical philologist.

From 1877 he studied theology in Lausanne, followed by studies of classical philology at several German universities. He worked as a gymnasium teacher in the municipalities  of Durlach and Bruchsal, and in 1889 obtained his habilitation in classical philology from the University of Bern. In 1899 he became a full professor at Bern, and later relocated to the University of Halle, where from 1907 to 1926, he served as a professor of classical philology.

Published works 
In 1909 he published the tenth edition of Friedrich Ueberweg's Grundriß der Geschichte der Philosophie, Teil 1: Die Philosophie des Altertums (Outline of the History of Philosophy, Volume 1: The Philosophy of Antiquity); often referred to as the "Ueberweg-Praechter". In 1919 he released a radically revised 11th edition, and in 1926 he published the 12th and final version of the "Ueberweg-Praechter". Other noteworthy writings by Praechter include:
 Cebetis Tabula quanam aetate conscripta esse videatur, 1885.
 Die griechisch-römische Popularphilosophie und die Erziehung, 1886 – The Greco-Roman popular philosophy and education.
 Kleine Schriften, 1892 – Minor works.
 Kebētos pinax = Cebetis Tabula, 1893 – On Cebes' "Tabula.
 Hierokles der Stoiker, 1901 – Hierocles the Stoic.

References 

1858 births
1933 deaths
University of Lausanne alumni
University of Marburg alumni
Academic staff of the University of Bern
Academic staff of the University of Halle
Writers from Heidelberg
German classical philologists